Louw de Graaf (12 April 1930 – 15 July 2020) was a Dutch politician of the defunct Anti-Revolutionary Party (ARP) and later the Christian Democratic Appeal (CDA) party and trade union leader.

De Graaf worked as a trade union leader for the National Christian Trade unions (CNV) from September 1955 until December 1977 and served as General-Secretary from May 1970 until December 1977.

After the election of 1977 De Graaf was appointed as State Secretary for Social Affairs in the Cabinet Van Agt-Wiegel, taking office on 28 December 1977. De Graaf was elected as a Member of the House of Representatives after the election of 1981, taking office on 10 June 1981. Following the cabinet formation of 1981 De Graaf was not given a cabinet post in the new cabinet, the Cabinet Van Agt-Wiegel was replaced by the Cabinet Van Agt II on 11 September 1981 and he continued to serve in the House of Representatives as a frontbencher and deputy spokesperson for Social Affairs and Employment. On 12 May 1982 the Cabinet Van Agt II fell just seven months into its term and continued to serve in a demissionary capacity until the first cabinet formation of 1982 when it was replaced by the caretaker Cabinet Van Agt III with De Graaf's appointment as Minister of Social Affairs and Employment, taking office on 29 May 1982. After the election of 1982 De Graaf returned as a Member of the House of Representatives, taking office on 16 September 1982. Following the second cabinet formation of 1982 De Graaf was again appointed as State Secretary for Social Affairs and Employment in the Cabinet Lubbers I, taking office on 5 November 1982. After the election of 1986 De Graaf again returned as a Member of the House of Representatives, taking office on 3 June 1986. Following the cabinet formation of 1986 De Graaf continued as State Secretary for Social Affairs and Employment in the Cabinet Lubbers II, taking office on 14 July 1986. De Graaf served as acting Minister of Social Affairs and Employment from 3 February 1987 until 6 May 1987 following the appointment of Jan de Koning as acting Minister of the Interior during a medical leave of absence of Kees van Dijk. The Cabinet Lubbers II fell on 3 May 1989 following a disagreement in the coalition about the increase of tariffs and Excises and continued to serve in a demissionary capacity. In July 1989 De Graaf announced that he wouldn't stand for the election of 1989.

In September 1989 De Graaf was nominated as a Chairman of the Supervisory board of the National Health Care Institute, he resigned as State Secretary for Social Affairs and Employment the same day he was installed as chairman, serving from 1 October 1989 until 1 July 2003.

Decorations

References

External links

Official
  L. (Louw) de Graaf Parlement & Politiek

 

 
 
 

1930 births
2020 deaths
Anti-Revolutionary Party politicians
Commanders of the Order of the Netherlands Lion
Christian Democratic Appeal politicians
Dutch nonprofit directors
Dutch trade union leaders
Officers of the Order of Orange-Nassau
Ministers of Social Affairs of the Netherlands
Members of the House of Representatives (Netherlands)
Members of the Social and Economic Council
People from Achtkarspelen
Protestant Church Christians from the Netherlands
Reformed Churches Christians from the Netherlands
State Secretaries for Social Affairs of the Netherlands
20th-century Dutch civil servants
20th-century Dutch politicians
21st-century Dutch civil servants